Singapore participated at the 2018 Asian Para Games which was held in Jakarta, Indonesia from 6 to 13 October 2018.

The Singaporean delegation is composed of 44 athletes which participated in 10 out of 18 events in the games namely: Archery, Athletics, Badminton, Boccia, Bowling, cycling, Lawn bowls, Powerlifting, Shooting and swimming. Ali Daud serves as the head of the delegation

Medalists
The following Singaporean competitors won medals at the Games.

Medals by sport

Medals by day

See also
 Singapore at the 2018 Asian Games

References

External links
 Jakarta 2018

Nations at the 2018 Asian Para Games
2018 in Singaporean sport